Herman Louis Ekern (December 27, 1872 – December 4, 1954) was an American attorney and progressive Republican politician who served as the 28th lieutenant governor of Wisconsin, the 25th attorney general of Wisconsin, and the 42nd speaker of the Wisconsin State Assembly.  He was also one of the founders of Lutheran Brotherhood.

Background
Herman Louis Ekern was born in 1872 near Pigeon Falls, Wisconsin. He was the son of Even Ekern and Elizabeth ( Grimsrud) Ekern. He received a law degree from the University of Wisconsin Law School in 1894. Following his graduation, he practiced law at Whitehall, Wisconsin in co-partnership with H. A. Anderson under the firm name of Anderson & Ekern.

Career
Five years later was elected district attorney of Trempealeau County. He served three terms in the Wisconsin State Assembly, from 1903 until 1907, and was the speaker of the Assembly in his final term. During his time in the Assembly, he was noted for helping design Wisconsin's life insurance code. From 1911 until 1915, he served as Wisconsin's insurance commissioner. Afterwards, he helped form a law partnership which specialized in insurance cases and helped write the Federal Soldiers' and Sailors' War Risk Insurance Act.

Lifelong Lutherans, Herman Ekern  and J. A. O. Preus, Minnesota insurance commissioner and future Governor of Minnesota (1921–1925) had proposed launching a not-for-profit mutual aid society. The founding of Lutheran Brotherhood came as a result of the 1917 merger convention of the Norwegian Lutheran Church of America.  In 1929, Herman Ekern became president in the organization which would grow in time to become Thrivent Financial for Lutherans.

Ekern later returned to his political career, serving as Wisconsin's Attorney General from 1923 until 1927. After Lieutenant Governor Henry Gunderson resigned in 1937, Governor Philip La Follette named Ekern Lieutenant Governor the following year.  The appointment was challenged and upheld in State ex rel. Martin v. Ekern. After his term ended in 1939, Ekern served on the Board of Regents of the University of Wisconsin until 1943. Ekern later was in private law practice in Chicago and Madison.

In 1949, he received a Distinguished Alumni Award from the Alumni Association of the University of Wisconsin. Herman Ekern died in 1954. The papers  of Herman Ekern are maintained within the archives of the Wisconsin Historical Society.

References

Further reading
 Brøndal, Jørn. Ethnic Leadership and Midwestern Politics: Scandinavian Americans and the Progressive Movement in Wisconsin, 1890-1914. Northfield, Minn.: Norwegian-American Historical Association, 2004.

External links

1872 births
1954 deaths
People from Trempealeau County, Wisconsin
Republican Party members of the Wisconsin State Assembly
Speakers of the Wisconsin State Assembly
Lieutenant Governors of Wisconsin
Wisconsin Attorneys General
District attorneys in Wisconsin
American Lutherans
Wisconsin Progressives (1924)
20th-century American politicians
University of Wisconsin Law School alumni
American people of Norwegian descent